2443 Tomeileen, provisional designation , is a stony Eoan asteroid from the outer regions of the asteroid belt, approximately  in diameter. It was discovered on 24 January 1906, by German astronomer Max Wolf at the Heidelberg-Königstuhl State Observatory in Heidelberg, Germany. The S-type asteroid was named after the parents of British astronomer Brian G. Marsden. It has a rotation period of 3.97 hours.

Orbit and classification 

Tomeileen is a member the Eos family, the largest asteroid family of the outer main belt consisting of nearly 10,000 asteroids. It orbits the Sun in the outer main-belt at a distance of 2.8–3.2 AU once every 5 years and 3 months (1,903 days; semi-major axis of 3.01 AU). Its orbit has an eccentricity of 0.06 and an inclination of 11° with respect to the ecliptic. The body's observation arc begins with its official discovery observation at Heidelberg in January 1906.

Physical characteristics 

Tomeileen has been characterized as a stony S-type asteroid in the SDSS-MFB (Masi Foglia Binzel) taxonomy.

Rotation period 

Between 2004 and 2010, three rotational lightcurves of Tomeileen were obtained from photometric observations by Brazilian and Argentine astronomers, Amadeo Aznar at Puzol Observatory , and Laurent Bernasconi in France. Lightcurve analysis gave a rotation period of 3.974, 4.0 and 6.822 hours with a brightness amplitude of 0.1, 0.10 and 0.13 magnitude, respectively. A low amplitude is indicative of a spherical rather than elongated shape.

Diameter and albedo 

According to the surveys carried out by the Infrared Astronomical Satellite IRAS, the Japanese Akari satellite and the NEOWISE mission of NASA's Wide-field Infrared Survey Explorer, Tomeileen measures between 28.44 and 37.577 kilometers in diameter and its surface has an albedo between 0.1042 and 0.199.

The Collaborative Asteroid Lightcurve Link derives an albedo of 0.1539 and a diameter of kilometers based on an absolute magnitude of 10.2.

Naming 

This minor planet was named after Thomas Marsden (1905–1980) and Eileen (née West) Marsden (1905–1981), the parents of British astronomer and longtime director of the Minor Planet Center (MPC), Brian G. Marsden (1937–2010). The official naming citation was published by the MPC on 8 April 1982.

Notes

References

External links 
 Asteroid Lightcurve Database (LCDB), query form (info )
 Dictionary of Minor Planet Names, Google books
 Asteroids and comets rotation curves, CdR – Observatoire de Genève, Raoul Behrend
 Discovery Circumstances: Numbered Minor Planets (1)-(5000) – Minor Planet Center
 
 

002443
Discoveries by Max Wolf
Named minor planets
19060124